Dresden-Trachau station is a railway station in the town of Dresden, Saxony, Germany. The station lies on the Pirna–Coswig railway.

References

External links
 

Trachau
Railway stations in Germany opened in 1902
DresdenTrachau